Raivo Adlas (born on 31 January 1940 in Kiisa, Harju County) is an Estonian actor and theatre director.

In 1965 he graduated from the Vanemuine theatre's learning studio. 1968–1991 he worked at the Vanemuine. After that he was a theatre director at several studio theatres (eg in Sinimandria). 1993–1995 he worked at Endla Theatre. Since 1995 he is working again at Vanemuine Theatre. Besides theatre roles he has played also in several films and television series.

Filmography

 2013–: Naabriplika (television series; role: Sokrates)
 2013: Hakkab jälle pihta 
 2014: Ööliblikad
 2016: Õnn tuleb magades (feature film; in role:	teacher Lokk)
 2016: Polaarpoiss (feature film; in role: court psychiatrist)
 2019: Klassikokkutulek 3: Ristiisad (feature film; in role:	Aksel)

References

1940 births
Estonian male stage actors
Estonian male film actors
Estonian male television actors
Estonian male radio actors
20th-century Estonian male actors
21st-century Estonian male actors
Estonian theatre directors
People from Saku Parish
Living people